Shaky Knees Music Festival is an annual music festival that takes place in Atlanta, Georgia. The festival was founded in 2013 by Tim Sweetwood in order to bring a proper indie music festival to the city of Atlanta, which already hosts festivals such as Sweetwater 420 Fest and Music Midtown. The festival is currently held in Central Park (Atlanta) in Old Fourth Ward.

Shaky Knees began as a two-day festival and his since expanded to include a third day. The festival features both artists from around the globe and smaller regional acts, primarily in the indie rock, indie folk, country music, and alternative rock genres. Performances in past years have included The Lumineers, Band of Horses, The National, Modest Mouse, Alabama Shakes, The Strokes, The Avett Brothers, Wilco, Edward Sharpe and the Magnetic Zeros, Spoon, The Gaslight Anthem, Mastodon, Cage the Elephant, Dropkick Murphys, Iron & Wine, Neutral Milk Hotel, Old Crow Medicine Show, Florence and the Machine, Jane's Addiction, My Morning Jacket, The Head and the Heart, Explosions in the Sky, The Decemberists, Huey Lewis and the News, Cold War Kids, The 1975 and *repeat repeat. In 2015 and 2016 Shaky Boots and Shaky Beats, two sister festivals, were founded; these focus more specifically on the country and EDM genres. The 2017 lineup included LCD Soundsystem, The XX, Phoenix, Cage the Elephant, Pixies, Portugal. The Man, Sylvan Esso, and many others.

History 
Tim Sweetwood, a booking agent for Masquerade Music Park in Atlanta, introduced the festival in 2013. The name comes from the song "Steam Engine" by My Morning Jacket, a band of which Sweetwood is a fan. Sweetwood founded the festival to fill a gap he saw in the Atlanta music scene, where preexisting festivals did not carry the types of artists that Shaky Knees now hosts. In an interview with the music magazine Consequence of Sound, Sweetwood stated that he envisioned Shaky Knees as a festival focused purely on music, as opposed to similar festivals like the Coachella Valley Music and Arts Festival, which has attractions other than musical acts. Going into the future, he says he wants to continue to develop the brand, but maintain the festival at a smaller size than other festivals like Bonnaroo and Coachella to ensure that all of the festival's attendees can enjoy the experience.

The first installment of the festival was held over two days in mid-May; it took place in Historic Fourth Ward Park and Masquerade Music Park, drawing acts such as The Lumineers, Jim James, and Band of Horses. The festival sold out and drew around 9,000 attendees per day.

In following years the festival has moved to different locations as it has continued to grow, but has remained within Atlanta. Sweetwood has stated that a goal of the festival is to remain within the city in a place that is accessible to both attendees that travel from afar and those who live locally. In its second year the festival moved to Atlantic Station, a neighborhood that was designed and redeveloped in 2005, and expanded to three days. 2015 saw the festival move to Central Park, expanding its capacity to around 40,000. In 2016 the festival moved to Centennial Olympic Park, where it remained in 2017. In 2018-19 it returned to Central Park.

Accolades 
In 2015 USA Today named Shaky Knees to the number four spot in its nationwide list of the "10Best Readers Choice: Best Music Festivals." Rolling Stone magazine listed Shaky Knees as one of its "50 Must-See Music Festivals" of summer 2015.

Sister Festivals 
Over time the founders of Shaky Knees introduced similar festivals exploring different genres of music.

Shaky Boots Music Festival 
In 2015, Sweetwood introduced Shaky Boots, a music festival centered around country music, because there was no major country music festival in Georgia. The festival took place over two days and included artists such as Blake Shelton, Brad Paisley, Dierks Bentley, Rascal Flatts, and Old Crow Medicine Show. The festival was the first major multiple-day country music festival to be held in the state of Georgia. The festival went on hiatus in 2016.

Shaky Beats Music Festival 

Shaky Beats Music Festival began in 2016 and took place in Centennial Olympic Park on the weekend following Shaky Knees. In its inaugural year it featured EDM acts such as Odesza, Major Lazer, Big Gigantic, Porter Robinson, and Carnage. In 2017 it included acts such as The Chainsmokers, Kaskade, GRiZ, Flosstradamus, and Zeds Dead.

References

External links 
Shaky Knees Official Website
Shaky Beats Official Website

Rock festivals in the United States
Folk festivals in the United States
Music festivals in Atlanta